Stenoma caesarea is a moth of the family Depressariidae. It is found in Guyana and Brazil.

The wingspan is 18–25 mm. The forewings are glossy light or dark violet-slaty grey with the extreme costal edge ochreous whitish. There is a small whitish-ochreous spot or mark on the costa at two-fifths, and a small cloudy ochreous-whitish spot just beneath it. A cloudy dark fuscous spot is found on the end of the cell and the terminal edge is obscurely whitish. The hindwings are grey.

References

Moths described in 1915
Taxa named by Edward Meyrick
Stenoma